Giovanni Azzone (born in Milan, on 24 November 1962) is an Italian engineer and academic, rector of the Polytechnic University of Milan between 2010 and 2016.

In 1986 Azzone graduated in industrial engineering from the Polytechnic University of Milan.

Principal publications 

Azzone, G., 1994, Innovare il sistema di controllo di gestione, Etaslibri, Milano.
Azzone, G., Bertelè, U., Noci, G., 1997, L'ambiente come vantaggio competitivo: un'opportunità per le imprese, Etaslibri, Milano.
Azzone, G., Bertelè, U., 1998, Valutare l'innovazione, Etaslibri, Milano.
Azzone, G., 2000, La gestione ambientale degli aeroporti, IPA, Milano.
Azzone, G., Bertelè, U., 2002, L'impresa – sistemi di governo, valutazione e controllo, Etaslibri, Milano 
Azzone, G., 2006, Sistemi di controllo di gestione, Etaslibri, Milano.
Azzone, G., 2007, Il controllo di gestione nelle amministrazioni pubbliche, Etaslibri, Milano.
Azzone, G., Campedelli, B., Varasio, E., 2011, Il sistema di programmazione e controllo negli atenei, Il Mulino, Bologna.

References

Academic staff of the Polytechnic University of Milan
Engineers from Milan
1962 births
Living people